Norman Issa (born 17 June 1967) is an Arab-Israeli actor, director in cinema, theatre and television.

Biography
Norma Issa was born and raised in Haifa, Israel, to a Maronite Christian-Arab family. He studied acting at Beit Zvi. He is married to Jewish-Israeli playwright Gidona Raz, with whom he has three sons. Lear and Sean Issa are actors. The couple jointly founded the multicultural Elmina Theater in Jaffa, Israel. They reside in Jaffa.

Theater, television and film career 
Issa has acted in many plays by William Shakespeare at the Haifa Theatre and Cameri Theatre. He worked at The Arab-Hebrew Theater together with fellow Arab-Israeli actor Yousef "Joe" Sweid. He was the main protagonist of the Israeli television sitcom Arab Labor, created by Arab-Israeli journalist Sayed Kashua.

In 2015, Issa refused to perform in a settlement in the Jordan Valley. In response,  Israeli Minister of Culture Miri Regev  threatened to shut down Israeli government funding to the theater that Issa founded.

Awards and recognition
At the 2016 Haifa International Film Festival, Norman Issa and Moshe Ivgy were awarded the prize for Best Actor in a Feature Film, for The 90 Minute War.

Filmography 
 The Syrian Bride (2004), directed by Eran Riklis
 Arab Labor (2007–present), created by Sayed Kashua
 Ana Arabia (2013), directed by Amos Gitai
 A Borrowed Identity (2014), directed by Eran Riklis
 The 90 Minute War (2016), directed by Eyal Halfon

See also
Television in Israel
Israeli cinema

References 

1967 births
Israeli male film actors
Israeli male stage actors
Israeli male television actors
Arab citizens of Israel
Israeli Arab Christians
Israeli Maronites
Living people
Beit Zvi School for the Performing Arts alumni